Proposition 64 may refer to:
 2012 Colorado Amendment 64
 California Proposition 64 (disambiguation)
 1986 California Proposition 64
 2004 California Proposition 64
 2016 California Proposition 64